Harvest is a 1937 French drama film directed by Marcel Pagnol, starring Fernandel, Orane Demazis, Marguerite Moreno and Gabriel Gabrio. The narrative revolves around a farming village where only three inhabitants remain, but they are told that if only one of them, Panturle, manages to find a wife, the village will be able to prosper again. The film is based on the 1930 novel Second Harvest by Jean Giono. It was released in France on 28 October 1937 and in the United States on 2 October 1939.

Cast
 Fernandel as Urbain Gédémus
 Gabriel Gabrio as Panturle
 Orane Demazis as Irène Charles, "Arsule"
 Marguerite Moreno as Zia Mamèche, "la Mamèche"
 Robert Le Vigan as the brigadier
 Henri Poupon as Panturle's farmer friend
 Odette Roger as Alphonsine
 Milly Mathis as Belline

Reception
Frank Nugent of The New York Times described Harvest as "a film of utter serenity and great goodness, so reverently played and so compassionately directed that it is far less an entertainment work than it is a testament to the dignity of man and to his consonance with the spinning of the spheres. Such faults as it possesses are mechanical; uneven editing, particularly in the early scenes; skimping of a few sequences that might have received more attention; attenuation of others that could have been cut. The flaws are obvious enough, yet they should not count too seriously against the work as a whole and still less seriously when one appreciates that the editing was on this side of the water (for space and time requirements) and cannot properly be held against Marcel Pagnol, its director, producer and adapter."

See also
 1939 in film
 Cinema of France

References

1937 films
Films based on French novels
Films based on works by Jean Giono
Films directed by Marcel Pagnol
Films set in France
Films shot in France
French drama films
1930s French-language films
Films scored by Arthur Honegger
1937 drama films
French black-and-white films
1930s French films